Pyrausta fuliginata is a moth in the family Crambidae. It was described by Hiroshi Yamanaka in 1978. It is found in Japan.

References

Moths described in 1978
fulginata
Moths of Japan